The term right of recall can mean:
The right of citizens to recall a representative or executive
The right of an employee under a collective bargaining agreement to be recalled to employment within a specified period after being laid off